Indo-French people or Indians in France are expatriate residents of France from India, as well as people of Indian national origin. , there were an estimated 65,000 Indians living in metropolitan France, in addition to 300,000 Indians in the French overseas departments and regions of Réunion, Guadeloupe, Martinique and French Guiana.

History
A majority of the Indian community hails from Puducherry and Chandannagar, the former French colonies in India. Later arrivals to mainland France were mostly Gujaratis, Keralites  and Indians from Mauritius, French Guiana,  Guadeloupe, Martinique, the Seychelles, Réunion, and Madagascar.

Notable people

 Nalini Anantharaman
 Nalini Balbir
 Henri Bangou
 Jacques Bangou
 Cynthia Brown
 Jayasri Burman
 Maya Burman
 Sakti Burman
 Anju Chaudhuri
 Jeanne Dupleix
 Ivan Grésèque
 Hidayat Inayat Khan
 Indila
 Romuald Karmakar
 Aurore Kichenin
 Lord Kossity 
 Subrata K. Mitra
 Prithwindra Mukherjee
 Rudgy Pajany
 Vasant Rai
 S. H. Raza
 Shumona Sinha
 Charles Sobhraj
 Samuel Moutoussamy 
 J. R. D. Tata 
 Kévin Théophile-Catherine
 Khal Torabully
 Vikash Dhorasoo
 Severus of Vienne
 Vijay Singh, filmmaker https://en.wikipedia.org/wiki/Vijay_Singh_(filmmaker)

See also
 Réunionnais of Indian origin
 Indians in Guadeloupe
 Indo-Martiniquais
 Indians in French Guiana
 Tamils in France
 France–India relations
 Romani people in France

References

External links
 Indians in France
 Indian Diaspora in Europe (France pages 13–16)

France
France
Ethnic groups in France
Asian diaspora in France
Immigration to France by country of origin